The Strait of Messina Bridge is a proposal to build a suspension bridge across the Strait of Messina in Italy to connect the cities of Torre Faro and Villa San Giovanni.

While a bridge across the Strait of Messina had been proposed since ancient times, the first detailed plan was made in the 1990s for a suspension bridge. The project was cancelled in 2006, under Prime Minister Romano Prodi. 
However, on 6 March 2009, as part of a massive new public works programme, Prime Minister Silvio Berlusconi's government announced that construction of the Messina Bridge would indeed go ahead, pledging €1.3 billion as a contribution to the bridge's total cost, estimated at €6.1 billion. 
The project was cancelled again on 26 February 2013, by Prime Minister Mario Monti's government due to budget constraints.

The bridge would have been the longest suspension bridge in the world, 60% more than the main span of the 1915 Çanakkale Bridge in Turkey, the world's current longest span. 
The bridge would have been part of the Berlin–Palermo railway axis (Line 1) of the Trans-European Transport Networks (TEN-T).

Geography

The Strait of Messina is a funnel-shaped arm of sea that connects the Ionian Sea in the south to the Tyrrhenian Sea to the north. It is also characterised by strong currents and the region has strong seismicity.

History
The idea of a bridge crossing the strait is an old one. The Romans considered building a bridge joining Calabria and Sicily made of boats and barrels. Pliny the Elder, philosopher and Roman military leader born in 23 AD wrote of a plan to bridge the Strait with a series of connecting boats. The idea was abandoned as it was clear that more traffic ploughed the Strait in a north-south than east-west direction, so any structure on water could not be permanent.

Charlemagne considered joining the two sides with a series of bridges. This idea was revived by the Norman adventurer Robert Guiscard in the 11th century and by Roger II of Sicily in the 12th century. In 1876, Giuseppe Zanardelli was convinced that the strait could be linked by either a bridge or a tunnel. In 1866, public works minister Stefano Jacini gave Alfredo Cottrau, an internationally recognised engineer, the task of drawing up plans for a bridge between Calabria and Sicily. Later, in 1870, Navone proposed building a tunnel based on Napoleon's idea of a tunnel under the English Channel. This tunnel was to start at Contesse and was to pass below Messina and Ganzirri at a depth of 150 m, crossing the Strait to Punta Pezzo and resurfacing at Torre Cavallo.

A geologic study of the area of the Strait of Messina was published in 1909 (historical Arch. Sicilian year XXXIV f.1,2) and in 1921, a study of an undersea tunnel was released to the Geographic Conference of Florence. A group of railway civil engineers studied the possibility of a suspension bridge but nothing came of it. The main cables would have been  in diameter. The bridge would have required 12,000 workers and cost hundreds of billions of lire.

Early planning stages
 In the 1960s, a wide variety of proposals were advanced, including everything from submerged tubes to floating struts, pontoons and a revolving central section of the bridge. None turned out to be realistic.
 In 1969, an international design competition was arranged.
 In the 1970s, feasibility studies were undertaken by the State Railways leading to the creation of a private company with responsibility for planning the crossing of the Strait.
 In the 1980s, the Messina Strait Company (Stretto di Messina S.p.A.) was set up with support from the State Railways, the regions and IRI. It concluded that it would be feasible to build a suspension bridge.
 Detailed plans followed in the 1990s with final approval from the High Council of Public Works (Consiglio Superiore dei Lavori Pubblici).

Development of detailed plans

Plans called for four traffic lanes (two driving lanes and one emergency lane in each direction), two railway tracks and two pedestrian lanes. This would have been taller than the Millau Viaduct in France (currently the tallest bridge in the world at ).

On the mainland, the bridge was to connect to the new stretch of the Salerno-Reggio Calabria motorway (A3) and to the planned Naples-Reggio Calabria High-Speed railway line; on the Sicilian side, to the Messina-Catania (A18) and Messina-Palermo (A20) motorways as well as the new Messina railway station (to be built by Rete Ferroviaria Italiana).

The bridge was planned to connect Reggio Calabria to Messina, the two cities that face each other on either side of the strait, in order to form a single city. This ambitious urban project was called Area Metropolitana integrata dello Stretto (Integrated Metropolitan Area of the Strait) or simply Città dello Stretto (City of the Strait). Among the controversies surrounding the building of the bridge was strong opposition to the formation of the new city by various Sicilian nationalist groups.

Abandonment
On 12 October 2006, the Italian Parliament voted 272 to 232 in favour of abandoning the plan due to the bridge's "doubtful usefulness and viability", as well as the inability of the already burdened Italian treasury to bear its share of the cost. Additionally, transport minister Alessandro Bianchi pointed out that the road and rail links leading to the location of the proposed bridge are not capable of supporting enough traffic to make the bridge profitable. Other reasons for abandoning the plan were earthquake risk and fears that the bridge would enrich the networks of Italy's organised crime organisations such as Cosa Nostra and 'Ndrangheta.

Contracting parties
A construction consortium led by Impregilo was chosen in 2005, with actual construction set to begin in the second half of 2006. The bridge was designed by Danish architects at Dissing+Weitling in close collaboration with the Danish engineering firm COWI.

On 27 March 2006, Impregilo and Stretto di Messina announced that they had signed a contract assigning final project planning to a General Contractor. Impregilo S.p.A., the lead partner had a 45% share. Other participants were Spain’s Sacyr (18.70%), the Italian companies Società Italiana per Condotte D’Acqua S.p.A. (15%) and Cooperativa Muratori & Cementisti-C.M.C. of Ravenna (13%), Japan’s IHI Corporation (6.30%), and Consorzio Stabile A.C.I. S.c.p.a (2%). The General Contractor would also be assisted by the Danish and Canadian companies COWI A/S, Sund & Baelt A/S and Buckland & Taylor Ltd., who would handle project engineering. Completion was projected to take six years, at a projected cost of €3.9 billion. The first task of the General Contractor was to draw up the final project.

Later initiatives

Criticisms 
Supporters see the bridge as a huge job-creation scheme and a boost for tourism. However, opponents question the priority of the bridge, claiming that if the government concentrated instead on making Sicily's roads more efficient, drivers would be able to reach the coast more quickly at a fraction of the bridge's cost.

Others believe that the bridge is quite unnecessary, since the local economy is already providing for the conversion of the local former NATO airport in Comiso into a commercial terminal to export vegetables to Northern Europe. Alternatively, a much cheaper revamping of the current structures is claimed to be sufficient (for instance, the ferry lines on the Calabria side are now accessible by trucks only by driving through very narrow streets, which are a tight bottleneck for transport).  Another argument against the bridge is the poor state of the transport infrastructure in Sicily, particularly the railroad and the A20 autostrada linking Messina to Palermo, and the poor state of the A2 autostrada on the mainland linking Reggio Calabria to Naples.

The greatest structural design problem of the bridge itself is the aerodynamic stability of its deck under wind and seismic activity.

See also
List of longest suspension bridge spans
Helsinki-Valletta Corridor
Trans-European Transport Network
Strait of Sicily Tunnel
Intercontinental and transoceanic fixed links
Akashi Kaikyō Bridge

References

Further reading 
 Fabio Spadi (2001) "The Bridge on the Strait of Messina: 'Lowering' the Right of Innocent Passage?" International and Comparative Law Quarterly 50: 411 ff.
 "From Rome to Sicily: Plane or Train?" Expert Travel Advice, The New York Times, Feb. 7, 2008 The New York Times.
 Fabio Brancaleoni, Giorgio Diana, Ezio Faccioli, Giuseppe Fiammenghi, Ian Firth, Niels J. Gimsing, Michele Jamiolkowski, Peter Sluszka, Giovanni Solari, Gianluca Valensise, Enzo Vullo: The Messina Strait Bridge - A Challenge and a Dream, Taylor and Francis, 2009, 300p,

External links
 Bridge design site (English version) - Currently under maintenance
 Ponte di Messina - A complete and detailed private site
Messina Bridge
Strait of Messina with the Messina Bridge
Bridging the Strait of Messina
 BBC News "Italy revives Sicily bridge plan"
 BBC News "Sicily bridge constructor named"
 Transcript of RAI broadcast Report about the bridge. 

 
Proposed bridges in Europe
Buildings and structures in Messina
Transport in Calabria
Transport in Sicily
Cross-sea bridges in Europe